Legion Within is a gothic industrial rock band founded in 2000 and based in Seattle, Washington.

Discography

References

Musical groups established in 2000
Musical groups from Seattle
American dark wave musical groups